Ozotroctes is a genus of beetles in the family Cerambycidae, containing the following species:

 Ozotroctes ogeri Tavakilian & Néouze, 2007
 Ozotroctes punctatissimus Bates, 1861
 Ozotroctes vassali Tavakilian & Néouze, 2007

References

Acanthoderini